The Memorial Complex of Stepanakert is a memorial located in Stepanakert, the de facto the capital of the self-proclaimed Republic of Artsakh, de jure in Azerbaijan.

History 
The memorial complex, built in honor of the 22,000 inhabitants of the Nagorno-Karabakh Autonomous Oblast of the Azerbaijan SSR who died during World War II, is centered around a  obelisk in the center. Those who died were entombed in the common grave formed on the opposite hill. Another part of the complex is a cascade pool with a fountain and seven ‘weeping’ springs constructed in the style of traditional Armenian monuments and classic ornamental art. On the granite pedestals are portraits of Armenian-Soviet soldiers of the Red Army who were honored as Heroes of the Soviet Union. The newest part of the complex is a cemetery where the Armenian military casualties of the First Nagorno-Karabakh War are buried. From 1945 to 1990, the memorial was managed by the Nagorno-Karabakh Regional Committee of the Communist Party of Azerbaijan. Since 1991, it has been owned by the government of the Republic of Artsakh.

Complex monuments and memorials 
The following structures are in the complex:

Victory Monument (also known as the Monument to the Unknown Soldier)
Wall of Triumph
Monument to the Victims of the Armenian genocide
Monument to the Victims of the Sumgait Massacre (erected in 1988)
Memorial to the Victims of the 1988 Armenian earthquake
Memorial to the Chairman of the NKR Supreme Council Artur Mkrtchyan 
Mass Grave of Armenian Soldiers

Gallery

References 

Soviet military memorials and cemeteries
Buildings and structures in Stepanakert
Monuments and memorials in Azerbaijan
Monuments and memorials in the Republic of Artsakh
1945 establishments in the Soviet Union